The Cytron Synagoge is a former synagogue at 24a Ludwika Waryńskiego street in Białystok, Podlaskie Voivodeship, Poland.

The synagogue was built in 1936 with money from the Cytron family of industrialists. Before 1941, Jews formed a very high percentage of the population of Białystok. The majority were murdered in the Holocaust during the German occupation of Poland,.

After the Second World War, the synagogue saw variable amounts of use, as the last operating synagogue in the city. It finally ceased to operate in the late 1960s. Many decorative elements were destroyed in renovations at the end of the 1970s.

Today, the synagogue building is used as the city's art gallery and museum.

References

External links 

 Description of the Synagoge on Virtual Shtetl

Former synagogues in Poland
Jews and Judaism in Białystok
Religious buildings and structures completed in 1936
Buildings and structures in Białystok
20th-century religious buildings and structures in Poland